C. J. Henderson may refer to:

C. J. Henderson (writer) (1951–2014), American writer
C. J. Henderson (American football) (born 1998), American football cornerback